The Jewish United Fund  of Chicago (JUF) is the central philanthropic address of Chicago's Jewish community and one of the largest not-for-profit social welfare institutions in Illinois. JUF provides critical resources that bring food, refuge, health care, education and emergency assistance to 500,000 Chicagoans of all faiths and millions of Jews in Israel and around the world, funding a network of 100+ agencies, schools and initiatives.

Allocations
National and Overseas—The Jewish United Fund of Chicago (JUF)  conducts fundraising activities by means of annual calendar year campaigns and makes allocations/grants to the Jewish Federations of North America (JFNA)  and the Jewish Federation of Chicago (JF).  Through its allocation to JFNA, JUF supports services to nearly 2 million individuals in Israel and 71 other countries.  These range from basic social service programs addressing needs of all age groups to formal and informal Jewish education/identity development.  The major beneficiary organizations that engage in overseas work through support from JFNA are the American Jewish Joint Distribution Committee, The Jewish Agency for Israel  and World ORT. (Russian: Общество Ремесленного Труда, Obchestvo Remeslenogo (pronounced: Remeslenava) Truda, "Association for the Promotion of Skilled Trades").

Community Relations—Through its support of the Jewish Community Relations Council (JCRC), JUF coordinates the collective policies and programs among 46 constituent Chicago-area Jewish organizations active in public affairs/community relations work.  JCRC educates and mobilizes the Jewish community for action through JUF and those constituent groups on issues ranging from Israel to Darfur, and from combating anti-Semitism to the broad array of intergroup relations (interfaith, interethnic, etc.).  JCRC activities and engagement takes place with the media, campuses, government, foreign diplomats, and religious and civic leaders.

One of Judaism's central tenets is the importance of passing traditions and teachings from generation to generation. JUF has a deep commitment to engaging the community's youth and inspiring their Jewish journeys, supporting a host of informal education and outreach experiences for young people that strengthen their Jewish identity and connections to community. In addition, JUF's TOV Volunteer Network provides hands-on volunteer opportunities for people of all ages to actively participate in tikkun olam, the repair of the world.

History

1900s
 Associated Jewish Charities of Chicago is founded on April 12, 1900 (Passover Eve). 
 Chicago Hebrew Institute (CHI), forerunner to Jewish Community Center (JCC) Chicago, founded.
 Associated Jewish Charities’ Jewish Home Finding Society pioneers foster care concept. 
 Michael Reese Hospital opens, begins 100 years of service.
 Jewish Aid Society launches first worker-training program.

1910s
 Home Finding Society leads to new Illinois law, a mother's pension act.
 Federation of Orthodox Jewish Charities of Chicago consolidates local Orthodox charities.
 Julius Rosenwald builds new home for Jewish Aid Society on West Side.
 Mount Sinai Hospital opens.

1920s
 Jewish Aid Society merges with Bureau of Personal Services to become Jewish Social Service Bureau, later provides services during Great Depression.  
 Chicago Hebrew Institute becomes Jewish People's Institute, begins construction of Camp Chi.
 Hebrew Theological College founded; Board of Jewish Education founded, establishes College of Jewish Studies.
 Associated Jewish Charities merges with Orthodox Federation, becoming Jewish Charities of Chicago. Julius Rosenwald is 1st president.

1930s
 Associated Talmud Torahs, Jewish Vocational Service, and Jewish Children's Bureau founded.
 Jewish Charities forms Jewish Children's Welfare Society.
 Jewish community leaders help found Community Fund of Chicago, now United Way.
 Depression-based school closings lead thousands of youths to enroll in Jewish People's Institute.
 United Jewish Appeal raises funds for European Jews in desperate need.

1940s
 Jewish Community Center of Chicago established to expand leisure activities of Jewish People's Institute.
 Jewish Social Service Bureau becomes Jewish Family and Community Service (JFCS).
 Jewish Charities, Jewish Welfare Fund merge fundraising as Combined Jewish Appeal.
 Operation Magic Carpet brings 50,000 Yemenite Jews to Israel on a 400-flight airlift.
 Jewish Charities becomes Jewish Federation of Chicago.

1950s
 Jewish Vocational Service pioneers therapeutic workshops for people with disabilities.
 Camp Chi moves to Lake Delton, WI.
 JFCS establishes Virginia Frank Child Development Center.
 Jewish Federation of Chicago moves to 1 S. Franklin.

1960s
 Jewish Welfare Fund supports Jewish programs on college campuses.
 Combined Jewish Appeal becomes Jewish United Fund; Philip Klutznick 1st chair.
 JUF establishes Public Affairs Committee, later Jewish Community Relations Council (JCRC).

1970s
 The ARK becomes a special grant agency; Response Center established.
 College of Jewish Studies becomes Spertus College of Judaica. 
 Jewish Federation merges with Jewish Welfare Fund.
 Federation establishes the Council for Jewish Elderly, now CJE SeniorLife.
 First Walk With Israel.
 Federation resettles some 300 Vietnamese refugees at US government request.
 JUF responds to proposed Nazi march in Skokie, as chronicled by the Illinois Holocaust Museum and Education Center.

1980s
 B'nai B'rith Hillel Foundations and College-Age Youth Services merge into Hillel-CAYS, today known as The Hillels of Illinois.
 Federation's Public Affairs Committee (later JCRC) co-sponsors rally in Evanston, protesting a proposed Neo-Nazi rally in that suburb; 4,000 attend.
 Federation opens Government Affairs offices in Springfield and Washington D.C.
 Federation opens EZRA Multi-Service Center in Uptown.
 Federation spearheads Operation Moses, bringing 10,000 Ethiopian Jews to Israel.
 SHALVA and Keshet founded; Keshet starts first Jewish day school for disabled children in U.S.
 JFMC Facilities Corporation established.
 JUF's Chicago Conference on Soviet Jewry flies 1,000 to D.C. for national, 200,000-strong rally, brings Federal lawsuit against USSR.

1990s
 Operation Exodus rescues and resettles 200,000 Soviet Jews over 10 years.
 JUF opens its Chicago Israel Office of the Federation in Jerusalem. 
 Operation Solomon airlifts 15,000 Ethiopian Jews to Israel in 24 hours.
 Federation establishes Community Foundation for Jewish Education and Jewish Women's Foundation.
 JUF celebrates Israel's 50th anniversary: 10,000 attend concert, 10,000 attend Walk with Israel.
 Petach Tikvah becomes Chicago's Israeli Sister City, having been JUF's Project Renewal sister city.
 JUF joins Partnership 2000 with the Kiryat Gat-Lachish-Shafir area of Israel's Negev. 
 JUF's JCRC escorts Joseph Cardinal Bernardin to Israel.
 JUF celebrates Jerusalem's 3,000th anniversary with its largest Mission to date.
 JUF helps draft first statewide bill making it illegal to raise funds to support terrorist activity.
 TOV: The Tikkun Olam Volunteer Network and The JUF Uptown Café established.

2000s
 Federation celebrates Centennial, launches Centennial Campaign, hosts General Assembly.
 JUF provides humanitarian aid to Kosovar refugees fleeing ethnic cleansing.
 JUF establishes Chicago Center for Jewish Genetic Disorders.
 JUF runs Israel Emergency Campaign to address needs created by these situations.
 JUF responds to terror attacks of September 11 with Terror Relief Fund, to Hurricane Katrina with humanitarian aid and volunteers. 
 25,000 attend first JUF's Israel Solidarity Day, incorporating the Walk With Israel, at McCormick Place.
 JCB and JFCS merge into Jewish Child and Family Services.
 Federation establishes Jewish Day School Guaranty Trust.
 Federation moves to new headquarters at 30 S. Wells after 48 years at 1 S. Franklin.
 JUF accompanies Sen. Barack Obama to Israel, then escorts Chicago Mayor Richard M. Daley there.
 JUF celebrates Israel's 60th anniversary with gala at Northwestern University, attended by 8,000, and concert at Millennium Park, attended by 15,000.

References

Further reading

 Relief agencies: Early outpouring of dollars for Haiti are critical (The Fundermentalist)
 Chicago federation steps up with $93,000 in relief for local agencies and food pantries (The Fundermentalist)
 Illinois to divest funds from Iranian-tied companies (JTA)
 United Jewish Communities Launches National Jewish Federation Bond Program (JFNA)
 Jewish Justice Jumpstarts Haitian Disaster Relief (All Voices)

External links
 Jewish United Fund

Jews and Judaism in Chicago
Jewish charities based in the United States
Organizations based in Chicago
Jewish community organizations
Jewish refugee aid organizations
Charities based in Illinois
Zionism in the United States